Annastasia Anneve Baker (born 16 November 1988) is a British Gospel singer, and song writer, Annastasia first caught the public eye as a contestant who progressed into the top six female singers in the judges round of the 2008 edition of The X Factor (UK series 5). Undeterred by not getting past this stage, Annastasia subsequently auditioned for the X Factor 2010 series, The X Factor (UK series 7) and once again made it to the judges round.

In 2013 Annastasia auditioned for and won the UK Gospel talent competition Time2shine.

On Christmas Eve of that same year, Annastasia launched the video to her first single release entitled "First Love".

This was followed on 15 June 2014 by the video for her second single release "Let Me Go".
Touched by the plight of the girls seized in Nigeria, this was Annastasia's contribution to the #bringbackourgirls awareness campaign.
Amongst the many highlights to her career during 2014 as a winner of Time2Shine series 3, Annastasia was invited to perform at Barbados Gospelfest, the Caribbean's premier Christian music and arts festival. Annastasia also completed the recording of her first album entitled "You Turn" which was preview launched at London's Jazz Café to a sold-out audience on 14 September. The album is anticipated to be on general release from early 2015.

Annastasia Baker was nominated for a MOBO Award in the "Best Gospel Act " category in September 2014.

Beginnings
The oldest of four siblings, Baker was born in Mandeville, Jamaica, West Indies, but grew up in London. South London based, she recalls growing up in a home filled with music. Her father, a multi instrumentalist also sang in a gospel harmony group and his interest in music across all genres had a profound impact upon the musical development of young Annastasia. Although Annastasia has always been driven to sing, she began to publicly display her talent on the emerging television talent contests as a potential platform during her early years.

Career
Baker first attracted the attention of Simon Cowell and the other judges on the panel of The X Factor (UK series 5) in 2008. She was mentored by Cheryl Cole, but failed to be chosen at Judges Houses for the live finals. She returned for The X Factor (UK series 7) in 2010, again mentored by Cheryl, but again did not progress to the live finals.

In 2013 Baker won the Time2shine gospel talent search competition and gained access to the development focus she had always craved to best hone her craft.

Baker undertook her first US tour during September 2014. As with her Jazz Cafe preview launch earlier that month, Baker performed songs from her upcoming album during this tour.

Annastasia Baker was the Critics Choice Award winner, 2014, of the Gospel Touch Music Awards. GTMA is an organisation that celebrates the achievement of gospel artists.

Annastasia Baker became a MOBO Award nominee in the Best Gospel Act category for 2014. In 2015 Anastasia Baker embarked upon a multiple date UK-wide tour, including an appearance at the Copper Box Arena supporting the US Gospel artist Kirk Franklin, culminating in her own headline date at the O2 Shepherds Bush Empire later that year.

In 2022, Baker was a contestant and finalist on the ITV talent show Starstruck, impersonating and performing as Tina Turner.

You Turn (2015)
On 1 June 2015, Annastasia Baker released her debut album entitled "You Turn". A single entitled "First Love" was the lead track taken from the album and released some months in advance of this date. The album will featured a duet with Sunday Best (TV series) winner Joshua Rogers who also appeared in the video for the track, filmed in Atlanta during Annastasia's US tour in September 2014.

References

External links 

 

1988 births
Living people
British gospel singers
Jamaican emigrants to the United Kingdom
Musicians from London
People from Mandeville, Jamaica
The X Factor (British TV series) contestants
21st-century British singers